A rukun tetangga (abbrievated RT, literally "pillar of neighbours") is an administrative division of a village in Indonesia, under a rukun warga. The RT is the lowest administrative division of Indonesia.

The rukun tetangga operates through consultation in the framework of community service, set by the village or villages.

The local level of governance of rukun warga and rukun tetangga also includes the rukun kampung 

A rukun tetangga is chaired by a ketua RT elected by its citizens. An RT consists of a number of households (KK).

Most information about governance and functioning of the RT and RW is in Indonesian. Some non-Indonesian anthropologists have written about the functions and issues.

See also 

 Barangay
 Tonarigumi

Notes

 
Subdivisions of Indonesia

Indonesia, Villages
Law of Indonesia
Society of Indonesia